Ronald Sydney Embleton (6 October 1930 – 13 February 1988) was a British illustrator who gained fame as a comics artist. In the 1950s and 1960s, Embleton also pursued a career as an oil painter, and he exhibited his works widely in Britain, Germany, Australia, Canada and the USA. He was a member of the London Sketch Club and the National Society of Painters, Sculptors and Printmakers, and in 1960 was elected a member of the Royal Institute of Oil Painters.

Following Embleton's death at age 57, his obituary in The Times described him as "responsible for some of the finest full-colour adventure series in modern British comics ... a grandmaster of his art." David Ashford and Norman Wright, writing in Book and Magazine Collector (March 2002), note that "his work for such diverse periodicals as Express Weekly, TV Century 21, Princess, Boys' World, and Look and Learn have earned him the respect of every practitioner in the field and the gratitude of all of us who admire the art of the comic strip."

His younger brother is fellow illustrator and comics artist Gerry Embleton.

Biography

Early life and education 
Embleton (who, in his early career, simply signed his work "Ron") was born in London and submitted his first cartoon at the age of nine and, aged 12, won a national poster competition. He trained at the South East Essex Technical College and School of Art, where his tutors included David Bomberg, who would prove a great influence on Embleton's subsequent work as a painter of both figures and landscapes.

Early career 
On the completion of his training he worked in a commercial studio for six months, during which time he began freelancing comic strips to independent publishers. "Ron" was beginning to establish himself when Embleton turned 18 and was called up for his National Service, during which time he served in south-east Asia during the Malayan Emergency.

In 1950, Embleton returned to freelancing, setting up a studio with a schoolfriend, Terry Patrick, and James Bleach, whom Patrick knew from life-drawing classes. The three quickly established themselves with various independent publishers — Scion, TV Boardman, Norman Light, DCMT and others — and Embleton also began contributing to Amalgamated Press's Comet, Comic Cuts, Cowboy Comics, and Super Detective Library.

Children's comics 
Embleton's finest work during this period was for Mickey Mouse Weekly where he drew Rogers' Rangers (1953), Strongbow the Mighty (1954–57) and Don o' the Drums (1957), and Express Weekly, where he took over the artwork (and subsequently the scripting) of Wulf the Briton. It was on the latter that he developed his techniques for working in colour, creating over 300 pages of meticulously painted artwork during his four-year run on the strip (1956–60).

His fascination with historical characters and settings served him well with later strips, Wrath of the Gods (Boys' World, 1963) and 'Johnny Frog' (Eagle, 1964), although Embleton was equally at home with contemporary adventure strips (Biggles, TV Express, 1960) and science fiction: his artwork for Stingray in TV Century 21 led to the show's creator, Gerry Anderson, inviting Embleton to provide artwork to grace the closing credits of his new show, Captain Scarlet and the Mysterons. His ten paintings depicted Captain Scarlet in various states of peril and appeared under the closing credits at the end of every episode. After shooting they were stored in producer Reg Hill's safe where they remained in perfect condition for more than thirty years. In 2003, all ten works were sold by Reg Hill's estate at Christie's auction house in South Kensington, fetching between £2,500 and £3,500 each. Shortly afterward, publisher Iconagraph produced limited-edition versions of the art, each signed by Francis Matthews, the voice of Captain Scarlet.

In the 1960s, Embleton was also a prolific contributor to Look and Learn, producing illustrations for numerous series, including The Bath Road (1962), Pioneers Across the Atlantic (1962), The Travels of Marco Polo (1964), Men of the Jolly Roger (1965), Rogers' Rangers (1970) and Legends of the Rhineland (1972–73) amongst others.

In 1969, Embleton illustrated a fill-in story in the long-running Trigan Empire strip. During this period, Embleton also provided illustrations for titles aimed at younger children, amongst them Playhour, Once Upon a Time, The Storyteller, and numerous books.

In 1971, he became a frequent contributor to IPC's World of Wonder magazine, a similar publication to Look and Learn which also relied on painted illustrations by a roster of British artists. Embleton provided artwork for long-running features such as Men of Waterloo (1971), Ships of the Seven Seas (1971), The Winning of the West (1972) and Mutiny! (1972), as well as contributing a number of cover paintings (issues 118, 124 and 131). 

Late in 1973, he returned to World of Wonder to illustrate an adaptation of Lewis Carroll's Alice's Adventures in Wonderland. It was the increasing demand for his comic work that led Embleton to largely cease exhibiting his oil paintings at around this time.

Later work 
During the late 1970s, Embleton was commissioned by This England magazine to draw what became a total of forty-three characters from Dickens and the Classics which were published quarterly throughout the 1980s. All these coloured illustrations in large A2 format are now in private ownership.

As well as providing illustrations for historical books and prints, Embleton spent much of the remainder of his career illustrating full-colour comic strips for Penthouse. Oh, Wicked Wanda! (1973–80) was written by British author Frederic Mullally and poked fun at politics and sexual mores; it was followed by Sweet Chastity, written by Penthouse founder Bob Guccione.

Death 
Embleton died of a heart attack at his home in Bournemouth on 13 February 1988, aged 57. As well as The Times, obituaries appeared in a number of other national newspapers, including The Daily Telegraph and The Independent, the latter noting that whilst Embleton was "internationally famous"' for his Penthouse comic strip, "he was also a fine illustrator whose penchant for historical accuracy and detail went beyond mere craft". In The Guardian he was lauded as "a comic strip artist of extraordinary energy and versatility, so wide-ranging in what he did that he might seem on the face of it to have straddled the void —or pit — which [George] Orwell saw gaping between the "gentle" English tales and the sadomasochistic "Yank mags" in the famous essay on Boys' Weeklies."

Bibliography

Written and illustrated
 Pioneers and Heroes of the Wild West, by Embleton (London, Purnell, 1969 )

Illustrated
 The Adventures of Robin Hood Annual 2–4, nn, by Arthur Groom (London, Adprint, 1957–60)
 King Arthur and His Knights (London, Spring Books, 1957?)
 Davy Crockett Painting Book (London, Birn Bros, 1957?)
 The First Book of Heroes, by David Thornycroft (London, Dean, 1958)
 The Adventures of Sir Lancelot 2 (London, Adprint, 1958)
 Hawkeye and the Last of the Mohicans, by David Roberts (London, Adprint, 1959)
 R.C.M.P. Annual, by Graham Anderson (London, Purnell, 1961)
 Robin Hood Painting Book (London, Purnell, 1961)
 Great Spy Stories, ed. Virginia Shankland (London, Purnell, 1966)
 The Valiant Book of Pirates (London, Fleetway, 1967)
 The Finding Out Book of Battles, by George Surtees (London, Purnell, 1968)
 Slumber Tales, retold by Shirley Dean (Young World, 1968)
 The Land of Tales, retold by Edward Holmes (North Cheam, Young World, 1969 )
 The Nightingale Book of Fairy Tales, retold by Shirley Dean (London, Young World, 1969)
 Time for Tales, retold by Phylis Brown (North Cheam, Young World, 1969 )
 The Story of Newspapers, by W. D. Siddle (Loughborough, Wills & Hepworth Ladybird Books, 1969)
 Once Upon Another Time, being the latest adventures of your best loved fairytale folk, by Anne Webb (Sutton, Young World, 1970 )
 Know About Dogs, by Edward Holmes (North Cheam, Young World, 1970 )
 Know About the World by Edward Holmes (North Cheam, Young World, 1971 )
 Aladdin, and other fairy stories, by Anne Webb (London, Young World, 1971 )
 Jack and the Beanstalk, and other fairy stories, by Anne Webb (London, Young World, 1971 )
 Sleeping Beauty, and other fairy tales, by Anne Webb (London, Young World, 1971 )
 Snow White, and other fairy tales, by Anne Webb (London, Young World, 1971 )
 The Ghost of Crumbling Castle, by Jane MacMichael (London, Blackie, 1972 )
 My Rhyme Book of Fairytale Land (Sutton, Young World, 1972 )
 Birds of the Farne Islands, by Peter Hawkey (Newcastle upon Tyne, F. Graham, 1973 )
 The Frog Prince and five other traditional tales, retold by Jane MacMichael (Glasgow, Blackie, 1973 )
 Puss in Boots [and] Tom Thumb (London, Collins, 1973 )
 Snow-White and the Seven Dwarfs, retold by Christian Willcox (Glasgow, Blackie, 1973 ). Pop-up book with models designed by Brian Edwards
 The Roman Wall Reconstructed, by Charles Daniels (Newscastle upon Tyne, F. Graham, 1974 )
 Geordie Pride, by Frank Graham & Sid Chaplin (Newcastle upon Tyne, F. Graham, 1974 )
 Historical Northumberland, by Frank Graham (Newcastle upon Tyne, 1975 )
 Holy Island, by Frank Graham (Newcastle upon Tyne, F. Graham, 1975 )
 What the Soldiers Wore on Hadrian's Wall, by H. Russell Robinson (Newcastle upon Tyne, F. Graham, 1976 )
 Hansel and Gretel and The Frog Prince (London, Collins, 1978 )
 Cinderella and The Sleeping Beauty (London, Collins, 1978 )
 Snow White and Little Red Riding Hood (London, Collins, 1978 )
 Housesteads in the Days of the Romans, by Frank Graham (Newcastle upon Tyne, F. Graham, 1978 )
 Chesters and Carrawburgh in the Days of the Romans, by Frank Graham (Newcastle unpon Tyne, F. Graham, 1979 )
 Legions of the North, by Michael Simkins (Oxford, Osprey, 1979 )
 The Purnell Book of Famous Fairy Tales, by Barbara Hayes (Maidenhead, Purnell, 1979 )
 The Roman Army from Hadrian to Constantine, by Michael Simkins (Oxford, Osprey, 1979 )
 The Armour of the Roman Legions, by H. Russell Robinson (Newcastle upon Tyne, F. Graham, 1980 )
 The Conquest of Mexico to the Great Fire of London (Basingstoke, Macmillan Children's Books, 1980 ). Series of wallcharts illustrated by Embleton, Angus McBride and Kenneth Lowther
 South Shields, Wallsend, Newcastle and Benwell in the Days of the Romans, by Frank Graham (Newcastle upon Tyne, F. Graham, 1980 )
 Dean's Enchating Stories from the Magic Castle (London, Dean, 1981 ). Jointly illustrated by Gill Embleton
 Roman Cook Book (Newcastle upon Tyne, F. Graham, 1981 ). Jointly illustrated by Gill Embleton
 The Stanegate, Corbridge, Vindolanda and Carvoran in the Days of the Romans, by Frank Graham (Newcastle upon Tyne, F. Graham, 1981 )
 Birdoswald, Bewcastle and Castleheads in the Days of the Romans, by Frank Graham (Newcastle upon Tyne, F. Graham, 1982 )
 Benwell to Chester in the Days of the Romans, by Frank Graham (Newcastle upon Tyne, F. Graham, 1982 )
 Best Known Fairy Stories, by Charles Perrault, retold by Lornie Leete-Hodge (London, Dean, 1983 )
 Children's Favourite Stories, by Hans Christian Andersen, retold by Lornie Leete-Hodge (London, Dean, 1983 )
 Best Children's Stories, by the Brothers Grimm, retold by Lornie Leete-Hodge (London, Dean, 1983 )
 The Best Traditional Fairy Stories, retold by Lornie Leete-Hodge (London, Dean, 1983 )
 Hadrian's Wall in the Days of the Romans, by Frank Graham (Newcastle upon Tyne, F. Graham, 1984 )
 Aesop's Fables, retold by Lornie Leete-Hodge (London, Dean, 1985 )
 Kenneth Grahame's The Wind in the Willows, retold by Lornie Leete-Hodge (London, Dean, 1985 )
 Oscar Wilde's The Happy Prince, retold by Lornie Leete-Hodge (London, Dean, 1986 )
 Sinbad the Sailor, retold by Lornie Leete-Hodge (London, Dean, 1986 )
 Finding Out with Terry and Son, by Conrad Frost (London, Express Newspapers, 1987 )
 Hadrian's Wall Reconstructed (Butler, 1987 )
 Caesar's Legions. The Roman soldier 753BC to 117AD, by Nicholas V. Sekunda et al. (Oxford, Osprey, 2000 ). Illustrated by Embleton, Richard Hook and Angus McBride. Based on previously published titles Early Roman Armies, Republican Roman Army 200-104BC and The Roman Army from Caesar to Trajan''

Notes

References

Ron Embleton at Lambiek's Comiclopedia

External links
The Gerry Anderson Complete Comic History - covering the first part of Embleton's Stingray
Look and Learn search for Ron Embleton

British comics artists
British erotic artists
British cartoonists
1930 births
1988 deaths